Domingo Germán Saiz Villegas (8 June 1912 – 24 April 1989), nicknamed Fede, was a Spanish footballer. The nickname origin was the name of a brother who died before he was born.

Born in Molledo, Cantabria, during his club career he played for Deportivo Alavés, Real Sociedad and Sevilla FC. He earned 3 caps for the Spain national football team in 1934, and played in the 1934 FIFA World Cup.

Honours
Sevilla FC
Copa del Rey: 1935, 1939

External links
BDFutbol

1912 births
Year of death missing
Spanish footballers
Spain international footballers
Footballers from Cantabria
1934 FIFA World Cup players
La Liga players
Deportivo Alavés players
Real Sociedad footballers
Sevilla FC players
Association football midfielders